Jeffrey Sánchez (born July 18, 1969) is an American politician who served as a member of the Massachusetts House of Representatives from 2003 to 2019. He represented the Fifteenth Suffolk district, which is made up of the Boston communities Mission Hill, Jamaica Plain, and Roslindale, as well as the Precinct 5 of the Town of Brookline.

Sanchez has a nephew attending the Judge Rotenberg Center–a school condemned by the United Nations for torture of its students–and has defended its use of aversives, and prevented the institution from being shut down.

Early life and education 
Sánchez was born in the Washington Heights neighborhood of Manhattan and raised in the Boston neighborhood of Mission Hill. He graduated from the University of Massachusetts Boston, where he earned a Bachelor of Arts degree in Legal Education. Later, he attended the John F. Kennedy School of Government at Harvard University where he received a Master in Public Administration in 2011 and was a Rappaport Urban Scholar.

Career 
Before running for the House of Representatives, Sánchez served as Mayor Thomas Menino’s liaison to the Hispanic community for six years.  In 2000, Sánchez led Boston’s efforts to count the population for the census. He previously worked in San Diego as a financial management advisor and investment banker.

Massachusetts House of Representatives 
Sánchez was elected to the Massachusetts House of Representatives in 2003. In his second term, he served as Vice-Chair of the Joint Committee on Economic Development and Emerging Technologies. In February 2009, he was appointed to the Joint Committee of Public Health by Speaker Robert DeLeo and has worked on issues related to affordable housing, healthcare access and quality and youth development initiatives. On July 9, 2013, Sánchez, in response to a nationwide outbreak of fungal meningitis stemming from a compounding pharmacy in Framingham, released legislation reforming state oversight of the pharmaceutical compounding industry of Massachusetts. His legislation has been hailed as a "national model" by several industry experts and academics.

On September 4, 2018, he was defeated in the Massachusetts Democratic primary by newcomer Nika Elugardo.

Sanchez has repeatedly prevented the Judge Rotenberg Center from being shut down and defended its right to use aversives on residents. Sanchez's nephew attended the institution

Personal life
Sánchez is a resident of Jamaica Plain, where he lives with his wife Brenda and his daughter and son.

References

External links 
 Legislative homepage
 JeffreySánchez.org

1969 births
University of Massachusetts Boston alumni
Harvard Kennedy School alumni
Living people
Hispanic and Latino American state legislators in Massachusetts
Democratic Party members of the Massachusetts House of Representatives
21st-century American politicians
People from Washington Heights, Manhattan
People from Jamaica Plain